A sound test is a function built into the options screen of many video games.
This function was originally meant to test whether the game's music and sounds would function correctly (hence the name), as well as giving the player the ability to compare samples played in Monaural, Stereophonic and later Surround sound.

In modern times, most sound tests function mostly as a jukebox to listen to the game's music, sound effects, and voice tracks for enjoyment outside of the game itself. They are sometimes used as a place to enter cheat codes.

Sound test and cheat codes

Some games feature cheat codes related to the sound test. Usually, songs need to be played in a particular order.  For instance, in Sonic the Hedgehog 2, it is possible to select levels in this manner.

In some games, a cheat code might be necessary to reach the sound test screen (such as in Sonic the Hedgehog 3), or some other specific method is needed to unlock it, such as "buying" it with earned credit for achievements in-game.

In other games, the sound test is unrelated to cheat codes and is often among the last items to be unlocked. Alternatively, in some games the sound test is available from the beginning, and expands as the player encounters new sounds or music during normal gameplay.

Sound Test in Electronic Games
A lot of well known manufacturers like Hasbro and Mattel implement sound testing modes in their electronic handheld games. These are usually activated in manufacture and also people discover them in their own time and share them on video sharing sites like YouTube. Games such as Bop It, Brain Warp and the Loopz Shifter have a hidden program on which when entered, the toy starts saying random numbers like "1.36" and then the toy is expecting you to press one of its buttons to advance to the next stage of the test mode. There are also additional sound test modes which allows you to press a button that will make different sound effects. This website details how to access every test mode on all the Bop It games.

References

Video game gameplay
Electronic games